Özge Gürel Çayoğlu (born 5 February 1987) is a Turkish actress.

Life
Of Circassian and Turkish origin, Özge Gürel was born on 5 February 1987 in Istanbul. Her father is of Circassian descent while her maternal family were Turkish immigrants from Thessaloniki. She lived in Silivri, Turkey, until she finished high school. Gürel initially studied business at the Beykent University, but left it unfinished. She then took acting lessons, followed by acting management lessons.

Gürel stepped into the world of acting with the character of "Zeynep" in Kızım Nerede?. In 2014, she became the lead actress in Kiraz Mevsimi. Between 2016–2017, Kiraz Mevsimi was broadcast on Canale 5, one of Italy's most famous channels, and became the first Turkish TV series broadcast on Italian television. She played the leading role in the TV series Yıldızlar Şahidim in 2017.
Gürel also played the lead role of "Nazlı Pinar Aslan" in Dolunay with co-star Can Yaman in 2017.
 
In 2020, Gürel started playing the lead role "Ezgi" in the Turkish series Bay Yanlış (Mr. Wrong), opposite Can Yaman. The series is produced by Gold Film, directed by Deniz Yorulmazer, and its script is written by Aslı Zengin and Banu Zengin Tak. It premiered on FOX in June 2020 and concluded in October 2020.

Personal life 
On 14 July 2022, Gürel and her longtime boyfriend Serkan Çayoğlu married in Germany. Family and close friends attended the intimate ceremony.

Filmography

References

External links
 IMDb profile

1987 births
Living people
Turkish people of Circassian descent
Actresses from Istanbul
Turkish television actresses
Turkish film actresses
Beykent University alumni